Million Dollar Traders is a 2009 British reality television series devised by hedge fund manager Lex van Dam, which attempted to recreate the famous Turtle Traders experiment devised by Richard Dennis in the 1980s.

Background
Million Dollar Traders follows a group of twelve wannabe traders dealing in shares during the events of the financial crisis of 2007-2009 which was then whittled down to the final eight. The contestants come from various backgrounds, including a fight promoter, a day trader, an IT/banking recruitment consultant, a working mother, a retired IT engineer and a student, among others. During the series van Dam gave the London-based contestants the sterling equivalent of $1 million of his own money to trade for 2 months. Former professional trader Anton Kreil was appointed as the manager of the group.

As with the original experiment, those who lasted the course broadly confirmed the claim that novices could become professional-level traders, making small profits or at least lower losses trading in very turbulent markets during the filming than professionals, who lost four times greater amounts over the same period. The three-part BBC series, narrated by Andrew Lincoln, was a part of the "City Season" programming on the BBC. It aired on BBC 2 in the UK at 9pm on Monday evenings between 12 and 27 January 2009.

Episode list

Contestants

References

External links

BBC Television shows
British reality television series
2009 British television series debuts
2009 British television series endings
Business-related television series in the United Kingdom
Trading television shows